Lists of relevant space exploration milestones in the period 1957–1969 include:

 Timeline of the Space Race
 Timeline of space exploration

Spaceflight timelines